This article contains a list of National Cultural Sites in Uganda in the Western Region of Uganda as defined by the Uganda Museum.

List of monuments 

|}

See also 
 National Cultural Sites in Uganda for other National Cultural Sites in Uganda
 Isunga Cultural Community in Uganda for a great cultural experience in Fortportal

References

Western
Cultural Heritage Monuments, Western
Western Region, Uganda